Elijah Pemberton (born May 31, 1997) is an American professional basketball player for the Santa Cruz Warriors of the NBA G League. He played college basketball for the Hofstra Pride.

High school career
Pemberton attended Xavier High School for three years. He played one season at The Masters School and one at Cheshire Academy, scoring more than 2,000 points in his scholastic career. Pemberton averaged 26 points per game in 2014–15 and 21 points per game in 2015–16. He became a four-time team Most Valuable Player between 2013 and 2016, a four time All-Connecticut selection. He also became the 2016 Jordan Brand Classic Regional Game MVP, a first team All-New England pick as a senior and a second team All-New England as a junior.

College career
Pemberton played college basketball for Hofstra. He started his second game as a freshman and was named CAA rookie of the week on three occasions. Pemberton averaged  12.8 points, 3.3 rebounds and 2.0 assists per game as a freshman. As a sophomore, he averaged 15.9 points, 4.8 rebounds and 2.2 assists per game. Pemberton averaged 15 points and 4.8 rebounds per game as a junior, helping lead Hofstra to a CAA regular season championship. In his senior season, he saw action in 34 games with averages of 17.6 points, 5.6 rebounds, 1.9 assists and 1.29 steals over 36.3 minutes per game. Pemberton led Hofstra to a berth in the 2020 NCAA tournament, but the tournament was cancelled due to the COVID-19 pandemic. By the end of his college career, he had earned All-CAA Second Team honors as a junior and a senior in addition to the 2020 All-CAA Tournament honors. Pemberton saw action in 129 career games while averaging 15.4 points, 4.7 rebounds and 2.1 assists in 34.8 minutes per contest. Pemberton ranks ninth in Hofstra program history with 1,982 career points and fourth with 215 three-pointers.

Professional career
After going undrafted in the 2020 NBA draft, Pemberton signed an Exhibit 10 deal with the Golden State Warriors on December 19, 2020, but was waived the same day. On January 12, 2021, he signed as an affiliate player with the Santa Cruz Warriors of the NBA G League, where he played 10 games and averaged 6.4 points, 2.8 rebounds and 1.0 assists in 17.6 minutes per game.

Personal life
Pemberton has one brother, William Allen, who played basketball at Johnson C. Smith and a cousin, Chauncey Hardy, who played basketball at Sacred Heart. He earned a degree in Management in May, 2020.

References

External links
Hofstra Pride bio
RealGM.com profile
Twitter handle

1997 births
Living people
American men's basketball players
Basketball players from Connecticut
Cheshire Academy alumni
Hofstra Pride men's basketball players
Santa Cruz Warriors players
Shooting guards
Sportspeople from Middletown, Connecticut
United States men's national basketball team players